John E. Osborn (born September 4, 1957) is an American lawyer and former diplomat who served in the United States Department of State during the administration of President George H. W. Bush, and later as a member of the United States Advisory Commission on Public Diplomacy.

Family
Osborn is the son of Patricia (née O'Donovan) and Edward R. Osborn. He has Irish, English and German ancestry. His father was a practicing lawyer and local magistrate, his uncle was the former major league baseball broadcaster Gene Osborn, and his maternal grandfather was an airline industry pioneer and Pentagon official who was closely associated with former U.S. Secretary of Defense Louis A. Johnson. He is a direct descendant of Josiah Osborn (b. 1762) who fought in the Revolutionary War with colonial militias in Connecticut and New York. He married the former Deborah Powell of Wilmington, Delaware in 1984; they have two daughters.

Early life and education
Osborn is a fourth generation native of Davenport, Iowa. He attended parochial and public schools there, and graduated from Davenport Central High School in 1975. He matriculated at the College of William & Mary and graduated Phi Beta Kappa from the University of Iowa in 1979, where he majored in economics and history and wrote for The Daily Iowan.  He received a master's degree in international public policy from the Johns Hopkins University Paul H. Nitze School of Advanced International Studies, and earned his J.D. in 1983 from the University of Virginia School of Law, where he was an Articles Editor of the Virginia Journal of International Law.

Career

Government and politics
Osborn was nominated to the Advisory Commission by President George W. Bush in 2007, and confirmed by the United States Senate on March 13, 2008.[1] The Commission is an independent bipartisan panel established by the United States Congress in 1948 to assess the effectiveness of the government's public diplomacy policies and programs; it reports its findings and recommendations to the President and the Congress.[2] Following the 9/11 attacks, there was increased interest in effectively communicating American policies, traditions and values directly to foreign publics, and the role of the Commission in evaluating and improving this work was heightened. During his tenure, the Commission gained attention for a report that was critical of the U.S. Foreign Service's human resources policies and practices in the hiring, training and career development of public affairs and public diplomacy officers.[3]  From 1989 to 1992, he served with the U.S. State Department under Secretary James A. Baker III, where he worked with an inter-agency group to reconcile executive privilege concerns in response to Congressional oversight of policies leading to the first Gulf War.[4] After law school, he clerked for Judge Albert Vickers Bryan of the United States Court of Appeals for the Fourth Circuit.

Business and corporate law
Osborn is a senior advisor with the international law firm Hogan Lovells. Prior to this, he was corporate counsel for several companies in the life sciences and healthcare sectors, including a Merck & Co. joint venture company. Among other things, he worked on the 2010 acquisition by McKesson Corporation of the cancer services company US Oncology. On behalf of Cephalon, he brought and settled complex intellectual property litigation against several generic drug companies that ensured continuing protection for the company's franchise product Provigil (modafinil) that was later challenged by the Federal Trade Commission as a controversial "pay for delay"scheme[5]. He also has been active in policy advocacy, and led an effort to enact passage of the Controlled Substances Export Reform Act of 2005.[6] Early in his career, he practiced law in Boston with Hale and Dorr (now Wilmer Cutler Pickering Hale and Dorr) where he was a member of a U.S. Supreme Court appellate team in a landmark case that struck down the "sale of business" securities law doctrine.[7]

Academic and non-profit organizations

Osborn is an affiliate professor of law at the University of Washington in Seattle and has lectured at the Ross School of Business of the University of Michigan, Ann Arbor since 1997.  He has held visiting appointments in public health at the University of California, Los Angeles, in politics at Princeton University, and in socio-legal studies at the University of Oxford [8] where he was a visiting senior member of Wadham College. In 2004, Osborn was appointed by Secretary of State Colin Powell to the Board of Governors of the East-West Center, an international education and research center in Honolulu focused on the Asia Pacific region.  In 1998 he was awarded an Eisenhower Fellowship and traveled to Northern Ireland to examine the roots of the conflict and the status of the peace process. He is a trustee of the Brandywine River Museum, a former trustee of Tower Hill School, and a member of the Council on Foreign Relations and the American Law Institute.

Publications

Osborn is a contributing columnist for Forbes.com and STAT, and has published op-ed columns and notable essays in law and policy journals, including:
 "Can I Tell You the Truth? A Comparative Perspective on Regulating Off-Label Scientific and Medical Information," 10 Yale Journal of Health Policy, Law & Ethics 299 (2010), https://www.researchgate.net/publication/45492912_Can_I_tell_you_the_truth_A_comparative_perspective_on_regulating_off-label_scientific_and_medical_information.  The article was cited by the majority in United States v. Caronia (2d Cir. 2012), https://www.nytimes.com/2012/12/04/business/ruling-backs-drug-industry-on-off-label-marketing.html?_r=0.
 "A U.S. Perspective on Treaty Succession and Related Issues in the Wake of the Breakup of the USSR and Yugoslavia," 33 Virginia Journal of International Law 261 (with Edwin D. Williamson)(Winter 1993).  The article was cited in a Memorandum to the White House by the Justice Department's Office of Legal Counsel in considering the question of the continuing viability of the ABM treaty with the Soviet Union (June 26, 1996).

References

 https://georgewbush-whitehouse.archives.gov/news/nominations/1213.html.
 Background information about the United States Advisory Commission on Public Diplomacy may be found at https://www.state.gov/about-us-u-s-advisory-commission-on-public-diplomacy/
 "Getting the People Part Right, A Report on the Human Resources Dimension of U.S. Public Diplomacy," (2008), https://2009-2017.state.gov/documents/organization/106297.pdf. See also "A Reliance on Smart Power -- Reforming the Public Diplomacy Bureaucracy," Hearing of the U.S. Senate Committee on Homeland Security and Governmental Oversight (September 23, 2008), https://www.govinfo.gov/content/pkg/CHRG-110shrg45580/html/CHRG-110shrg45580.htm
 The inquiries were led by the U.S. House Committee on Foreign Affairs and its Chairman Rep. Dante Fascell (D-Fla.). For the political and policy context of the congressional investigations and the effort to discredit the first Bush administration, see https://www.nytimes.com/1992/06/27/world/the-1992-campaign-bush-s-greatest-glory-fades-as-questions-on-iraq-persist.html?auth=login-email
 https://query.nytimes.com/gst/fullpage.html?res=9900E4D71E3FF936A35756C0A9609C8B63; "Settling for More," IP Law and Business (May 18, 2006); "Settlements Are Legitimate," National Law Journal (September 13, 2006), http://www.law.com/jsp/nlj/PubArticleNLJ.jsp?id=900005462439&slreturn=1&hbxlogin=1; https://www.nytimes.com/2008/05/07/business/worldbusiness/07iht-pharma.4.12666780.html?scp=1&sq=cephalon%20settlement&st=cse; "FTC Sues Cephalon, Inc. for Unlawfully Blocking Sale of Lower-Cost Generic Versions of Branded Drug Until 2012,"  http://www.ftc.gov/opa/2008/02/ceph.shtm; https://www.reuters.com/article/idUSN1338428320080214?pageNumber=1&virtualBrandChannel=0; http://money.cnn.com/magazines/fortune/fortune_archive/2007/02/05/8399155/index2.htm. Osborn also testified on antitrust policy and life sciences product market merger analysis before the Antitrust Modernization Commission, which can be found at Proceedings on "Antitrust and the New Economy," http://govinfo.library.unt.edu/amc/commission_hearings/new_economy.htm
 Background information about the Controlled Substances Export Reform Act of 2005 may be found at https://www.deadiversion.usdoj.gov/imp_exp/reexport.htm
 Landreth Timber Company v. Landreth, 471 U.S. 681 (1985), http://supreme.justia.com/us/471/681/
 Background information about Oxford's Centre for Socio-Legal Studies may be found at http://www.csls.ox.ac.uk

External links
 Forbes.com contributor page at https://www.forbes.com/sites/johnosborn/
 Bloomberg executive profile page at https://www.bloomberg.com/research/stocks/private/person.asp?personId=192721&privcapId=20117
 Hogan Lovells lawyer profile page at https://www.hoganlovells.com/john-e-osborn
 "Lawdragon 500 Leading Lawyers in America" (September 14, 2007), https://web.archive.org/web/20110713192636/http://www.lawdragon.com/index.php/newdragon/leading_07
 University of Washington faculty page at https://www.law.uw.edu/directory/osborn-john
 Google Scholar page at https://scholar.google.com/citations?hl=en&user=Z6G-uFcAAAAJ

1957 births
Living people
People from Davenport, Iowa
United States Department of State officials
University of Virginia School of Law alumni
University of Iowa alumni
Paul H. Nitze School of Advanced International Studies alumni
College of William & Mary alumni
Princeton School of Public and International Affairs alumni
Wilmer Cutler Pickering Hale and Dorr people
People associated with Hogan Lovells